Communist Party of Extremadura (in Spanish: Partido Comunista de Extremadura), is the federation of the Communist Party of Spain (PCE) in Extremadura.

Extremadura
Political parties in Extremadura
Political parties with year of establishment missing